Naim Frashëri (12 August 1923 – 18 February 1975) was an Albanian actor. He was named a People's Artist of Albania.

Career
Frashëri pursued secondary studies at Qemal Stafa High School, in Tirana, Albania. Frashëri's love for theater had already started in 1942, however he started his professional acting career at the beginning of 1945. Among his main roles are those of Tartuffe in Tartuffe, Smith in Russian Affair, Gjoni in Trimi i mirë me shokë shumë, The General in the General of the dead Army (Gjenerali i ushtrise së vdekur), Leka in Përkolgjinaj, Nikolla in The Enemies (Armiqtë), Sasha Ribakov in the Kremlin hours (Orët e Kremlinit), Luben in the Leipzig Trial (Proçesi i Lajpcigut), Ferdinand in Intrigue and Love, Howard in Deep roots, Hamlet in Hamlet, Jonuz Bruga in The Fisherman's Family (Familja e Peshkatarit).

The role of Jonuz Braga was his last one. He has acted in 8 movies.

Awards and honors
Naim Frashëri has received many titles and orders as one of the icons of the Albanian Theatre. In particular he is recipient of the Hero of Socialist Labour title ("Hero i punës socialiste") and the People's Artist of Albania title.

Filmography
Skënderbeu (1953) .... Pali
Fëmijët e saj (1957, Short) .... Mësuesi
Tana (1958) .... Stefani
Furtuna (1959, Documentary) .... Qemali
Ngadhnjim mbi vdekjen (1967) .... Hans von Shtolc
Plagë të vjetra (1968) .... Doktor Pëllumbi
Gjurma (1970) .... Doktor Artani (final film role)

References

1923 births
1975 deaths
People from Kolonjë
20th-century Albanian male actors
Qemal Stafa High School alumni
People's Artists of Albania